Tolombón is a village and rural municipality in Salta Province in northwestern Argentina. It is in the Cafayate department. It is 14 km south of Cafayate. Currently, only 255 people live there.

History
It is unknown when this village was founded, but it is known that the Incas conquered it in 1480. Tolombón was invaded again in 1535, by the Conquistadors.

References

Populated places in Salta Province